James Ainslie (9 June 1880 – 31 December 1953) was an Australian cricketer. He played nine first-class cricket matches for Victoria between 1900 and 1910.

See also
 List of Victoria first-class cricketers

References

External links
 

1880 births
1953 deaths
Australian cricketers
Victoria cricketers
Cricketers from Melbourne